The Rafallah Sahati Brigade is named after one of the first Libyans to die while fighting Gaddafi's forces in March 2011 in Benghazi. The group began as a battalion of the 17 February Martyrs brigade, before expanding to become a group in its own right. Its members are estimated at 1,000 with presence in eastern Libya and in Kufra. The brigade took part in securing the national elections and other Ministry of Defence operations in eastern Libya. It has denounced the killing of the US ambassador in Benghazi.

References

Jihadist groups in Libya
First Libyan Civil War
Military of Libya
National Liberation Army (Libya)
Organizations designated as terrorist by Bahrain